CX 12 Radio Oriental is a Uruguayan Spanish-language AM radio station broadcasting from La Paz city in Canelones, its studios are located in Montevideo and its signal can be heard from the whole country and some cities from Argentina and Brazil.

History
It used to belong to the same multimedia group as CX 20 Radio Monte Carlo; in 2003 it was sold to the Uruguayan Roman Catholic Church.

Selected programs
 Musicalísimo (music/variety with Abel Duarte).
 En Perspectiva (Morning show with Emiliano Cotelo).
 Hora 25 de los deportes (Sports with Javier Máximo Goñi).
 Noticiero Oriental (News).
 Alas para el Folklore (regional music with Israel Ferraro)

References

External links
 
 770 AM

Spanish-language radio stations
Radio in Uruguay
Radio stations established in 1940
1940 establishments in Uruguay
Catholic Church in Uruguay
Catholic radio stations
Mass media in Montevideo